Gerald "Terry" Gleeson (16 October 1933 – 18 February 2011) was an Australian rules football player in the Victorian Football League (VFL).

He was a reserve player in all his three Grand Finals in 1955, 1956 and 1958.

External links

Melbourne Football Club players
Australian rules footballers from New South Wales
1933 births
2011 deaths
Melbourne Football Club Premiership players
Two-time VFL/AFL Premiership players